Ahmed Ali (1 March 1932 – 11 January 2020) was a Bangladeshi politician and lawyer belonging to Bangladesh Awami League. He was elected as a member of the East Pakistan Provincial Assembly  from Comilla-5. Later, he was appointed as a member of the Constituent Assembly of Bangladesh. He took part in the Language Movement. He was an organizer of the Liberation War of Bangladesh too.

Biography
Ali was born on 1 March 1932 in Nabinagar, Brahmanbaria. He took part in the Language Movement. He completed graduation in law from the University of Dhaka.

Ali was the founding vice president of Central Chhatra League.member Central Committee of Bangladesh Awami league, president and Secretary of cumilla zilla Awami league He took part in every movement against the Government of Pakistan from 1952 to 1971. He was elected as a member of the East Pakistan Provincial Assembly from Comilla-5 in 1970. Later, he was appointed as a member of the Constituent Assembly of Bangladesh. He was the first administrator of Comilla after the Liberation of Bangladesh.

Ali was an organizer of the Liberation War of Bangladesh. He hoisted the Flag of Bangladesh at Comilla Town Hall on 8 December 1971 after Comilla was clinched from the Pakistan Army.

Ali was the first elected vice chairman of the Bangladesh bar Council. He also wrote some books.

Ali died of prostate cancer in Apollo Hospital, Dhaka on 11 January 2020 at the age of 87.

References 

1932 births
2020 deaths
People from Brahmanbaria district
20th-century Pakistani lawyers
University of Dhaka alumni
Bengali language movement activists
Awami League politicians
People of the Bangladesh Liberation War
Deaths from cancer in Bangladesh
Deaths from prostate cancer
Bangladeshi male writers